
Gmina Szerzyny is a rural gmina (administrative district) in Tarnów County, Lesser Poland Voivodeship, in southern Poland.

The gmina contains part of the protected area called Pasmo Brzanki Landscape Park.

Villages
Gmina Szerzyny contains the villages and settlements of Czermna, Ołpiny, Swoszowa, Szerzyny and Żurowa.

Neighbouring gminas
Gmina Szerzyny is bordered by the gminas of Biecz, Brzyska, Jodłowa, Ryglice, Rzepiennik Strzyżewski, Skołyszyn and Tuchów.

References
Polish official population figures 2006

Szerzyny
Tarnów County